Frederick is a town in northwestern Brown County, South Dakota, United States. The population was 215 at the 2020 census. Home to the annual Frederick Finn Fest, the town is part of the Aberdeen Micropolitan Statistical Area.


History

Frederick was a railway town platted and sold to pioneers by the Chicago, Milwaukee & St. Paul Railroad, which completed track into it on September 12, 1881. Its grid of blocks was aligned by compass, with numbered avenues running north–south, and numbered streets running east–west. Main Street and Railway Avenue intersect at the grid's core. Incorporated on June 21, 1882, Frederick was named after the railroad's Finnish immigration agent and sales clerk—Kustaa "Frederick" Bergstadius.

On July 2, 1921, a tornado swept through the downtown and "practically every building in the town was demolished", but only one resident was killed, after his home was torn from its foundation while he was trying to get his family into the storm cellar.

Geography
Frederick is located at  (45.832812, -98.507026).

Frederick is drained by the Maple River.

The town is connected by U.S. Route 281.

Frederick has been assigned the ZIP code 57441 and the FIPS place code 22860.

Demographics

2010 census
As of the census of 2010, there were 199 people, 101 households, and 56 families living in the town. The racial makeup of the town was 98.5% White, 0.5% Asian, and 1.0% from two or more races.

There were 101 households, of which 22.8% had children under the age of 18 living with them, 47.5% were married couples living together, 2.0% had a female householder with no husband present, 5.9% had a male householder with no wife present, and 44.6% were non-families. 41.6% of all households were made up of individuals, and 18.8% had someone living alone who was 65 years of age or older. The average household size was 1.97 and the average family size was 2.66.

The median age in the town was 51.4 years. 19.6% of residents were under the age of 18; 2.4% were between the ages of 18 and 24; 21.5% were from 25 to 44; 29.1% were from 45 to 64; and 27.1% were 65 years of age or older. The gender makeup of the town was 55.3% male and 44.7% female.

2000 census
As of the census of 2000, there were 255 people, 119 households, and 76 families living in the town. The population density was 699.7 people per square mile (273.5/km2). There were 140 housing units at an average density of 384.2 per square mile (150.2/km2). The racial makeup of the town was 97.65% White, 1.18% Native American, 0.39% from other races, and 0.78% from two or more races. Hispanic or Latino of any race were 0.39% of the population. 45.2% were of German, 22.6% Norwegian and 7.5% Finnish ancestry.

There were 119 households, out of which 27.7% had children under the age of 18 living with them, 51.3% were married couples living together, 8.4% had a female householder with no husband present, and 35.3% were non-families. 33.6% of all households were made up of individuals, and 19.3% had someone living alone who was 65 years of age or older. The average household size was 2.14 and the average family size was 2.69.

In the town, the population was spread out, with 22.7% under the age of 18, 5.9% from 18 to 24, 23.9% from 25 to 44, 25.1% from 45 to 64, and 22.4% who were 65 years of age or older. The median age was 42 years. For every 100 females, there were 91.7 males. For every 100 females age 18 and over, there were 95.0 males.

The median income for a household in the town was $31,500, and the median income for a family was $34,688. Males had a median income of $25,288 versus $18,214 for females. The per capita income for the town was $13,881. About 11.1% of families and 11.4% of the population were below the poverty line, including 13.4% of those under the age of eighteen and 18.8% of those 65 or over.

Notable person
 Edward John Thye, former governor of Minnesota (1943-1947)

See also
 List of towns in South Dakota

References

Further reading
 History of Frederick, South Dakota

External links

 Town of Frederick, South Dakota
 Emma Burnham Public Library
 Frederick Area Historical Society
 Frederick Finn Fest

Towns in Brown County, South Dakota
Towns in South Dakota
Aberdeen, South Dakota micropolitan area
Populated places established in 1882
1882 establishments in Dakota Territory
Railway towns in South Dakota